Cussac-Fort-Médoc is a commune in the Gironde department in Nouvelle-Aquitaine in southwestern France.

Fort Médoc in Cussac-Fort-Médoc, together with several buildings in nearby Blaye, was listed in 2008 as a UNESCO World Heritage Site, as part of the "Fortifications of Vauban" group.

Population

See also
Communes of the Gironde department

References

Communes of Gironde